Sir John Weld may refer to:
 John Weld (merchant) (1582–1623), English landowner and London merchant
 John Weld (politician) (1613–1681), English politician